Venables-Vernon-Harcourt is a surname:
Edward Venables-Vernon-Harcourt (1757–1847), English clergyman
Francis Venables-Vernon-Harcourt (1801–1880), British politician
Robert Venables Vernon Harcourt (1878–1962), British diplomat, playwright

See also
Harcourt-Vernon
Vernon-Harcourt
Venables-Vernon
Harcourt (surname)
Vernon family
Venables

Compound surnames
Surnames of English origin
Surnames of Norman origin